International Community School may refer to:

International Community School (Kirkland, Washington), US
International Community School (Singapore)
International Community School of Addis Ababa, Ethiopia
International Community School (UK), London
International Community School (Thailand), Bangkok